Talita Nogueira (born October 13, 1985) is a female Brazilian practitioner and mixed martial artist competing in the Featherweight division of Bellator. Talita Nogueira is most notable for being the 2011 World Jiu-Jitsu Championship winner.

Mixed martial arts career

Early career
Prior to signing with Bellator, Nogueira fought exclusively in her native Brazil. Until June 2018 she has 7–1 record.

Bellator MMA
Nogueira signed with Bellator in August 2014.

Nogueira was expected to make her promotional debut at Bellator 133 against Julia Budd on February 13, 2015. However, Nogueira pulled out of the fight due to a knee injury and was replaced by Gabrielle Holloway.

Nogueira was scheduled to face Marloes Coenen at Bellator 163 but the bout was cancelled the day before the event when Talita failed to make weight.

Nogueira faced Amanda Bell at Bellator 182 on August 25, 2017. She won the fight via a rear-naked choke submission in the first round.

In her first title shot, Nogueira faced Julia Budd on July 13, 2018 at Bellator 202. She lost the title fight via TKO in the third round.

Nogueira faced Jessy Miele at Bellator 231 on October 25, 2019. She lost a close bout via split decision.

Talita faced Jessica Borga on April 9, 2021 at Bellator 256. She won via a unanimous decision, even with a point deduction in the second round due to an illegal blow to the back of Borga's head.

Mixed martial arts record

|-
|Win
|align=center|8–2
|Jessica Borga
|Decision (unanimous)
|Bellator 256 
|
|align=center|3
|align=center|5:00
|Uncasville, Connecticut, United States 
|
|-
|Loss
|align=center| 7–2
|Jessy Miele
|Decision (split) 
|Bellator 231
|
|align=center|3
|align=center|5:00
|Uncasville, Connecticut, United States
|
|-
| Loss
| align=center| 7–1
| Julia Budd
| TKO (punches)
| Bellator 202
| 
| align=center| 3
| align=center| 4:07
| Thackerville, Oklahoma, United States
|
|-
|Win
|align=center|7–0
|Amanda Bell
|Submission (rear-naked choke)
|Bellator 182
|
|align=center|1
|align=center|3:44
|Verona, New York, United States
|
|-
|Win
|align=center|6–0
|Michelle Oliveira
|Submission (arm-triangle choke)
|Taboao Fight Championship
|
|align=center|1
|align=center|3:56
|Sao Paulo, Brazil
|
|-
|Win
|align=center|5–0
|Rosemary Amorim
|Submission (armbar)
|Talent MMA Circuit 3: Guarulhos 2013
|
|align=center|2
|align=center|3:34
|Sao Paulo, Brazil
|
|-
|Win
|align=center|4–0
|Mahalia Rocha de Morais
|Submission (armbar)
|Green Fighters Combat
|
|align=center|2
|align=center|2:24
|Sao Paulo, Brazil
|
|-
|Win
|align=center|3–0
|Gringa Gringa
|TKO (punches)
|Expo Fighting Championship
|
|align=center|1
|align=center|3:45
|Sao Paulo, Brazil
|
|-
|Win
|align=center|2–0
|Gringa Gringa
|Submission (armbar)
|Reborn Fight 2
|
|align=center|2
|align=center|N/A
|Sao Paulo, Brazil
|
|-
|Win
|align=center|1–0
|Alessandra Thiola
|TKO (punches)
|Force Fighting Championship 3
|
|align=center|2
|align=center|2:50
|Sao Paulo, Brazil
|

References

External links
 
 

1985 births
Living people
Brazilian practitioners of Brazilian jiu-jitsu
Female Brazilian jiu-jitsu practitioners
Brazilian female mixed martial artists
Featherweight mixed martial artists
Mixed martial artists utilizing Brazilian jiu-jitsu
Bellator female fighters
Sportspeople from São Paulo
People from São Caetano do Sul
World No-Gi Brazilian Jiu-Jitsu Championship medalists